Nyhus is a surname. Notable people with the surname include:

Ani Nyhus (born 1983), Canadian softball pitcher
Åshild Breie Nyhus (born 1975), Norwegian musician
Egil Nyhus (born 1962), Norwegian illustrator
Ingfrid Breie Nyhus (born 1978), Norwegian pianist
Svein Nyhus (born 1962), Norwegian illustrator and writer of children's books
Sven Nyhus (born 1932), Norwegian folk musician, fiddler, composer and musicologist